Transmembrane protein 44 is a protein that in humans is encoded by the TMEM44 gene.

Gene 

mRNA sequence of the TMEM44 gene is 1483 base pairs long, with 13 exons.

Locus 

TMEM44 gene is located at the end of the long arm of chromosome 3 in humans (Homo sapiens).

Protein 

TMEM44 is 428 amino acids in length. The molecular weight of the protein is 47.1kDa, and its formula is  C2086H3315N585O611S22, with a total of 6619 atoms. TMEM44 is predicted to be integrated in the plasma membrane of the endoplasmic reticulum.

Expression 

There is an overall low level expression of TMEM44 protein throughout the developmental stages of an organism.

Transcripts 

There are 12 isoforms of TMEM44 including isoform a, isoform b, isoform c, isoform d, isoform X1, isoform X2, isoform X3, isoform X4, isoform X5, isoform X6, isoform X7, isoform X8.

Transmembrane Region Allocation 

There are seven predicted transmembrane domains in TMEM44 protein.

Interacting Proteins 

GSK3B (Glycogen synthase kinase 3 beta) is a protein predicted to physically interact with TMEM44.

Post-Translational Modification 

TMEM44 is predicted to undergo threonine, tyrosine and serine phosphorylations.

Orthologs 
TMEM44 orthologs includes groups such as amphibians, birds, fish, mammals.

Paralogs 
Predicted paralogous proteins of TMEM44 are C9IZ85, F8WCY1, F8WE47, H7C3X7, J3KQW3, Q6PL43, and Q96I73.

References

Further reading 

Transmembrane proteins